Welsh grammar reflects the patterns of linguistic structure that permeate the use of the Welsh language. In linguistics grammar refers to the domains of the syntax, morphology, semantics, phonetics, and phonology. The following articles contain more information on Welsh:

 Welsh syntax
 Colloquial Welsh morphology (the patterns that shape the spoken language as it is used by present-day Welsh speakers.)
 Colloquial Welsh adjectives (the rules governing the use of adjectives in modern colloquial Welsh as used by first-language Welsh speakers in Wales.)
 Colloquial Welsh nouns (the rules governing the use of nouns and noun-phrases in modern colloquial Welsh as used by first-language Welsh speakers in Wales.)
 Colloquial Welsh prepositions (the rules governing the use of prepositions in modern colloquial Welsh as used by first-language Welsh speakers in Wales.)
 Literary Welsh morphology (the rules governing the use of the formal written language, normally corresponding to older, historical patterns.)
 Welsh phonology

See also
 Welsh orthography
 Welsh numerals
 History of the Welsh language